Andreína Martínez Founier-Rosado (born September 22, 1997) is a Dominican-American model and beauty pageant titleholder who was crowned Miss Dominican Republic 2021 and represented Dominican Republic at the Miss Universe 2022 pageant, placing as 2nd Runner-Up.

Biography
Martínez was born in Santiago de los Caballeros, Dominican Republic and raised in New York City, United States. She attended Bronx Bridges High School where was the captain of the school's softball team. After high school she attended the City College of New York, University of New York where she graduated summa cum laude a bachelor's degree in psychology and Latin American studies.

Pageantry

Miss Dominican Republic 2021
Martínez represented the Dominican Community in the United States at Miss Dominican Republic 2021 on November 7, 2021, at the Salón de Eventos Sambil in Santo Domingo where she was crowned the winner by outgoing titleholder Kimberly Jiménez.

Miss Universe 2021 and 2022
Martínez was initially set to complete at Miss Universe 2021 but was replaced by 1st Runner-up Debbie Aflalo after Martínez tested positive for COVID-19 prior to the pageant. She was later designated as Miss Dominican Republic 2022 and will instead compete at the 2022 edition. In the 2022 edition, she was among the top 16, top 5, and top 3. She later became the 2nd runner up.

References

External links

1997 births
Living people
Dominican Republic beauty pageant winners
Miss Universe 2022 contestants